Antônio Carlos Heleno de Oliveira (born 5 May 1983 in Sao Paulo) is a retired Brazilian football player.

He played in the highest Bulgarian league for Slavia Sofia.

References

1983 births
Living people
Brazilian footballers
Association football midfielders
Associação Portuguesa Londrinense players
BFC Preussen players
Esporte Clube Pelotas players
PFC Slavia Sofia players
First Professional Football League (Bulgaria) players
Brazilian expatriate sportspeople in Germany
Brazilian expatriate sportspeople in Portugal
Brazilian expatriate sportspeople in Bulgaria
Expatriate footballers in Germany
Expatriate footballers in Portugal
Expatriate footballers in Bulgaria
Footballers from São Paulo